C-C-B was a Japanese pop-rock band under Polydor Records label active in years 1982–1989. At first, they were named CoConut Boys, however in 1985 the name changed to the initials, C-C-B. They became a nationwide success. In 2008, the band reformed once only with three members. The group's biggest hit, "Romantic ga Tomaranai", was used frequently in the Japanese television series Densha Otoko.

Members

CoConut Boys period
Tatsuya Yamamoto (山本達也): guitar, vocal
Yasufumi Yamashita (山下康文): guitar, vocal
Watanabe Hideki (渡辺英樹): bass, vocal
Ryu Koji (笠浩二): drum, vocal
Sekiguchi Makoto (関口誠人): guitar, vocal

C-C-B period
Watanabe Hideki (渡辺英樹) : bass, vocal
Ryu Koji (笠浩二): drum, vocal
Sekiguchi Makoto (関口誠人) : guitar, vocal
Taguchi Tomoharu (田口智治) : keyboard, vocal
Yonekawa Hideyuki (米川英之) : guitar, vocal

History

1982–1984: CoConut Boys
Although the band formation started in 1982, they wouldn't debut until June 1983 with the single Candy and the image as the Japanese-made Beach Boys. It was promoted as an image song for a Zen-Noh's Yogurts commercial. After the single release, two earlier members Yamashita and Yamamoto left the band. During the year, they released their debut album Mild Weekend.

In 1984, they released their second single, Hitomi Shoujo, with the two new members in, Yonekawa and Taguchi. The single was used as a commercial for Rohto Pharmaceutical's Rohto products. B-side track Chili Dog ga Okiniiri has been used as a commercial for car's brand Mazda Familia. During the year, they released their second original album Boy's Life. Both of their two singles and albums weren't successful enough and didn't enter the Best Ten or Oricon Rankings.

1985–1987: Commercial success and Sekiguchi's withdrawal
In 1985, the band name has been changed to the C-C-B with the Watanabe's explanation for ordinary people to find it easier to read and remember them.

After three years of no sales success and with the preparation for themselves to disband, their single Romantic ga Tomaranai has become their biggest and most well-sold single. It was used as a theme song to the Japanese television drama Maido Osawagaseshimasu. The single debuted at number 2 on the Oricon Weekly Single Rankings and remained at number 5 on Yearly Rankings. In the Best Ten rankings, they debuted at number 1 and remained at number 11 on Yearly Rankings. The single was rewarded as one of the best songs of the year along with the best arrangement of the year in the 27th Japan Record Awards.

The following single, School Girl wasn't as big a success as a previous single, the sound reminded of their earlier times and maintained in the top 10 charts. While the single version is performed by drummer Ryu, the album version is renamed with School Boy and performed by Sekiguchi. The single debuted at number 6 on Oricon Single Weekly Charts and remained on number 52 on Yearly Charts. In the Best Ten rankings, the single debuted at number 5 and remained in yearly rankings at number 37.

Their third single in the 1985, "Lucky Chance wo Mou Ichido" is also one of their biggest hits - debuted at number 3 on Oricon Single Weekly Rankings and remained number 50 on Yearly rankings, while in Best Ten Rankings it debuted at number 1 and remained in the yearly rankings at number 13. The song gave the band's first appearance on the end of the year special Kouhaku Uta Gassen. The single won the Best Ballad Song Award at the 1986's FNS Kayousai.

The fourth single of the 1985, Kuusou Kiss reprised role to be used as a theme song to the second season of the Japanese television drama Maido Osawagaseshimasu. While the original single version is performed by bassist Watanabe, the album version has different arrangement and is performed by Sekiguchi. The single debuted at number 3 on Oricon Single Weekly Rankings and remained on number 28 on 1986 Yearly Rankings. In Best Ten rankings, it debuted at number 2 on weekly rankings and remained on number 36 on 1986 Yearly Rankings.

Their first single in 1986, Genkina Broken Heart song was nominated on Number 4 on 15th Tokyo Music Festival. The single debuted at number 2 on Oricon Single Weekly Rankings and remained at number 61 on Yearly Rankings. In the Best Ten rankings, it also debuted at number 2 on weekly charts and remained at number 28 on Yearly Charts.

Following single, Fushizen na Kimi ga Suki has the main vocalist Sekiguchi instead of Watanabe or Ryu. It was also the first single to be written by members themselves. The single debuted at number 2 on Oricon Single Weekly Charts and remained on number 80 on Yearly Charts. In Best Ten rankings, the single debuted at number 3 and remained in yearly charts at number 38. The single has received the Best Song Music Award in the 1986's FNS Music Festival.

In December, the band released single Naimononedari no I Want You before Sekiguchi's withdrawal from the band and start of his solo career. It was used as a theme song to the regular Japanese television drama series Maido Osawagaseshimasu. The single debuted at number 1 on Oricon Single Weekly Charts, became their first single which debuted at number 1 on weekly charts. In the yearly 1987 charts it kept on number 65. On Best Ten rankings, it debuted at number 6 on weekly rankings and remained at number 35 on the Yearly Charts.

1987–1989: Sales decline and disbandment
On 6 April 1987, Sekiguchi officially left the band and the band started their activities as four-piece band.

On 3 June 1987 they've released single 2 Much, I Love U. The single debuted at number 2 on Oricon Single Weekly Charts and remained at number 98 on Yearly Charts. In the Best Ten ranking, they've debuted at number 2 and remained on number 84 on yearly charts.

On 23 September 1987, they've released single Genshoku Shitaine, which is their second single to be written by themselves. The single has received multiple promotional usage: it was used as commercial song to the Meiji Seika's chocolate Karukatta Wafer and theme song to the theatrical animated movie Shōri tōshu. The B-side track Love is Light has been used as an insert song to the movie as well. The single debuted at number 3 on Oricon Single Weekly Charts. In the Best Ten rankings, the single debuted at number 3 on weekly charts and remained at number 78 on Yearly Charts.

On 2 December 1987, the single Dakishimetai has the Yonekawa in the charge of main vocalist, previously he was only in the charge of back-vocals and main guitar. In the media, it was used as a theme song to the TBS Japanese television series Discovery of the World's Mysteries. The single debuted at number 6 on Oricon Single Weekly Charts and on number 5 on Best Ten Weekly Charts. It's also their last appearance in the Best Ten music television program.

With the less television appearances and lower position in the weekly charts, the band has felt their weakness in the popularity with the following three final singles and change to their music style.

Although the single Love Letter, which was released in April 1988, debuted at number 3 on Oricon Single Weekly charts, it was not as popular and recognised by the audience and the single Shinjiteireba was their final single to debut in Top 10 Single Weekly Charts.

On 21 April 1989, the band has announced the disbandment and four days later released final single Love Is Magic with the poor debut position, at number 17 on Oricon Single Weekly Charts. On 9 October, the band held the final live performance in the Budokan.

1990–1993: Members solo activities
After the band disbanded, Sekiguchi continued his solo activities through major recording label Pony Canon until 1992. During that time, Sekiguchi would write music for several artists including 1991 smash hit Futari Shizuka for singer Akina Nakamori. Since 2003 until the present (2020), he's active as a soloist under his own private music label Luxury Records.

Yonekawa started his solo career in the 1990s with the vocal-guitar albums and with the following new century released only guitar solo music works. Sometimes he provided music and participates in the music recordings for artists such as The Yellow Monkey and Eikichi Yazawa.

Watanabe formed various new indie bands and was musically active until 2008. Although Taguchi doesn't belong to a specific band, but participated in sessions and units with many artists and bands. Ryu had small success with his solo career, however in the end of century decided to distance from the music activities. From the 2010s, he was regularly invited to and appeared on television shows in which he sometimes performed Romantic ga Tomaranai.

1994–2015: Reunite attempts, Taguchi's arrest and Watanabe's eternal rest
In 1994, the band reunited for the first time in the special broadcast of Best Ten with all the members.

In 2004, some of the members reunited under the initials Yonetawataru (ヨネタワタル) which would hide the alphabets from their surnames. In 2011, they would change the band name from katakana into kanji initials: AJ-米田渡.

In 2005, the single Romantic ga Tomaranai was used as a commercial song to the Asahi Soft Drinks Canned coffee. With the increasing popularity of the song, it was used as a regular song to the television drama series Densha Otoko.

In 2007 the special skit C-C-B Goro was temporarily broadcast to the Japanese variety show SMAPxSMAP with the member Goro Inagaki with the visual copy of Ryu's outfit. On the special broadcast, the three members appeared for this occasion once in the street live to perform Romantic ga Tomaranai.

In 2008, the band reunited for the first time in 19 years only with the three former members - Sekiguchi, Watanabe and Ryu and performed live in the Osaka, Tokyo and Nagoya. The project of reuniting would fail in the 2009.

The July 2015 is marked as a painful year to the members and fans. On 2 July, Taguchi was arrested for the drug possession and on 13 July, Watanabe died at the age of 55 due to multiple organ failure. As the result, the unit project AJ has ended.

Discography

Singles
Candy (1983)
Hitomi Shoujo (1984)
Romantic ga Tomaranai (1985)
School Girl (1985)
Lucky Chance wo Mou Ichido (1985)
Kuusou Kiss (1985)
Genki na Broken Heart (1986)
Fushizen na Kimi ga Suki (1986)
Naimononedari no I Want You (1986)
2 Much, I Love U.(1987)
Genshoku Shitai ne (1987)
Dakishimetai (1987)
Love Letter (1988)
Shinjite Ireba (1988)
Love is Magic (1989)
Romantic ga Tomaranai Remix Version (2005)

Studio albums
Mild Weekend (1983)
Boy's Life  (1984)
Suteki na Beat(1985)「すてきなビート」
Bokutachi No-No-No (1985)「僕たちNo-No-No」
Bouken no Susume (1986)「冒険のススメ」
Ai no Tikarakobu (1986)「愛の力こぶ」
Ishi wa Yappari Katai (1987)「石はやっぱりカタイ」
Hashire☆Bandman (1988)「走れ☆バンドマン」
Shinjiteireba (1988)「信じていれば」

References

External links
Official website through Universal Music Japan 
Official Blog (Web-Archived) 
UpHill (Web-Archived) 
Official MySpace (Web-Archived)

Authority
Musicbrainz.org page 
ISNI 

Japanese pop music groups
Japanese pop rock music groups
Japanese rock music groups
Musical groups established in 1982
Musical groups disestablished in 1989
1982 establishments in Japan
1989 disestablishments in Japan